Scientists Under Attack: Genetic Engineering in the Magnetic Field of Money is a 2009 German documentary film by . It alleges that the biotechnology industry was implicit in ruining the careers of  Árpád Pusztai and Ignacio Chapela when they published research critical of genetic engineering.

The film premiered at the 2009 International Documentary Film Festival Amsterdam.

Synopsis
The 2009 documentary interviewed three scientists (Árpád Pusztai, Nina Fedoroff and Ignacio Chapela) and an attorney (Andrew Kimbrell). Pusztai was a biochemist who went to the media with unpublished research claiming that a type of genetically modified potato suppressed the immune system and stunted growth when fed to rats. The resulting controversy led to him being fired from the Rowett Institute. Fedoroff is a highly decorated molecular biologist who is an external adviser to the US Department of State. Chapela is a professor at the University of Berkeley and Kimbrell is the executive director of the Center for Food Safety who sued the FDA in 1998 over its regulation of GM foods.

Reception
The German ARD cultural magazine "titel thesen temperamente" broadcast a 6-minute review about the film. The Bayerischer Rundfunk described the film as committed, partisan and disputatious. KinoZeit calls it an ambitious documentary.

International awards
The documentary received 8 international prizes, including three for best documentary. It won 1st prize at Indie Fest 2010 in the feature documentary category.

References

External links
 
 Official Website in English

Documentary films about science
German documentary films
2009 documentary films
2009 films
2000s German-language films
Genetic engineering
2000s English-language films
2000s German films